Al-Shoulla, which translates to "torch", is a Saudi Arabian professional football club based in Al Kharj, playing in the Saudi First Division.

They won the Saudi Division 1 title in 2011–12 and were promoted to the top-level.

History

The kit providers are Puma.

Honours
Saudi First Division
Winners (1): 2011–12
Runners-up (2): 1996–97, 2000–01
Saudi Second Division
Winners (3): 1981–82, 1986–87, 2008–09
Runners-up (1): 1997–98
Prince Faisal bin Fahd Cup for Division 1 and 2 Teams
Runners-up (1): 1999–00

Source:

Current squad 

As of Prince Mohammad bin Salman League:

Managers
 Akram Salman (1993–94)
 Abdellah Mecheri (1998–99)
 Majed Al-Tufail (2006)
 Ali Kmeikh (2007–09)
 Kais Yâakoubi (2009–10)
 Aboud El Khodary (2011)
 Mohammed Salah (Dec 1, 2011 – Dec 31, 2012)
 Ahmad Al-Ajlani (2013)
 José Maqueda (2013–2014)  
 Eusebiu Tudor (2014-2015)
 Majdi Tolbah (2015-2016)
 Ademir Fonseca (2016–present)

References

External links

 Al Shoalah Profile at footballdatabase.eu
 Al-Shoalah Profile at goalzz.com
 Al-Shoalah Profile at kooora.com 
 Al-Shoalah at National-Football-Teams.com
 Al-Shoalah Profile at the Saudi Pro League Website 
 Al-Shoalah 2013–14 Season Profile at Slstat.com

 
Shoulla
Shoulla
Shoulla
Shoulla